Super Sabrina is the second studio album by Italian pop singer Sabrina, released in 1988 (and in some countries in 1989) by Videogram.

Album information
1988 saw the release of Sabrina's second album, titled Super Sabrina, in Italy, France and Denmark; and in 1989 in other countries. The standard format at the time was still the vinyl LP, with Italy adding a bonus in the form of a picture disc (using the picture as the standard LP). While all countries used the same picture-sleeve design, the track listings were quite different. Italy and Germany added "Boys (Summertime Love)" and "Sexy Girl" to the eight tracks especially produced for the LP. Denmark released only these eight tracks, while the French CD release couples the eight tracks with the 'Extended Mix' of "My Chico" and the 'Boy Oh Boy Remix' of "All of Me (Boy Oh Boy)". Most interesting is the Japanese CD, which contains several rare remixes, including the 5:03 version of "Doctor's Orders".

Singles 
Five singles were released from the album: "All of Me (Boy Oh Boy)", "My Chico", "Like a Yo-Yo", "Sex" and "Guys and Dolls". "All of Me (Boy oh Boy)" was written and produced by the British trio Stock Aitken & Waterman. Entering the charts in mid-summer 1988, the single became Sabrina's third major European hit. The second single "My Chico" reached No. 1 in Italy and No. 3 in Finland. The third single "Like a Yo-Yo" had success in Finland where it peaked at No. 1.

Track listings

CD version 
"Like a Yo-Yo" (G. Moroder) – 3:28
"All of Me (Boy Oh Boy)" (Stock Aitken Waterman) – 3:48 
"Doctor's Orders" (R. Cook, R. Greenaway, G. Stephens) – 3:18
"Funky Girl" (M. Fuliano) – 3:49
"My Chico" (S. Salerno, E. Moratto, O. Johnson) – 3:40
"Pirate of Love" (G. Moroder) – 4:00
"Guys and Dolls" (S. Salerno, M. Gianetto, Baldassarre) – 3:50
"Sex" (E. Pannuto, M. Zucchelli, A. La Bionda) – 4:10
"All of Me (Boy Oh Boy)" (Boy Oh Boy Mix) (Stock Aitken Waterman) – 6:02
"My Chico" (Extended Version) (S. Salerno, E. Moratto, O. Johnson) – 5:23

Vinyl version 
Side A
"Like a Yo-Yo" (G. Moroder) – 3:28
"All of Me (Boy Oh Boy)" (Stock Aitken Waterman) – 3:48 
"Doctor's Orders" (R. Cook, R. Greenaway, G. Stephens) – 3:18
"Boys (Summertime Love)" (M.Bonsanto, R.Rossi, C.Cecchetto, M.Charlton) – 3:55
"Funky Girl" (M. Fuliano) – 3:49

Side B
"My Chico" (S. Salerno, E. Moratto, O. Johnson) – 3:40
"Pirate of Love" (G. Moroder) – 4:00
"Sexy Girl" (M. Bonsanto, N. Hackett, R. Rossi) – 3:40
"Guys and Dolls" (S. Salerno, Giannetto, Baldassarre) – 3:50
"Sex" (E. Pannuto, M. Zucchelli, A. La Bionda) – 4:10

Charts

References

External links

1988 albums
Sabrina Salerno albums
Albums produced by Stock Aitken Waterman